Choeromorpha wallacei is a species of beetle in the family Cerambycidae. It was described by White in 1856, originally under the genus Agelasta. It is known from Borneo and Malaysia.

References

Choeromorpha
Beetles described in 1856